Charles Segal may refer to:

Charles Segal (classicist) (died 2002), American classicist
Charles Segal (pianist), jazz musician